Ireland competed at the 1932 Summer Olympics in Los Angeles, United States.

Medalists

Gold
 Pat O'Callaghan - Athletics, Men's Hammer throw
 Bob Tisdall - Athletics, Men's 400 m Hurdles

References
Official Olympic Reports
International Olympic Committee results database

Nations at the 1932 Summer Olympics
1932
1932 in Irish sport